Holbrook is a village in Furnas County, Nebraska, United States. The population was 207 at the 2010 census.

History
Holbrook was originally called Burton's Bend. When the railroad was built through the neighborhood circa 1880, the settlement was renamed Holbrook after a railroad official.

Geography
Holbrook is located at  (40.303850, -100.009439).

Demographics

2010 census
As of the census of 2010, there were 207 people, 90 households, and 56 families residing in the village. The racial makeup of the village was 97.6% White, 0.5% Native American, 1.0% from other races, and 1.0% from two or more races. Hispanic or Latino of any race were 6.8% of the population.

There were 90 households, of which 27.8% had children under the age of 18 living with them, 45.6% were married couples living together, 10.0% had a female householder with no husband present, 6.7% had a male householder with no wife present, and 37.8% were non-families. 25.6% of all households were made up of individuals, and 7.8% had someone living alone who was 65 years of age or older. The average household size was 2.30 and the average family size was 2.79.

The median age in the village was 43.8 years. 20.8% of residents were under the age of 18; 7.2% were between the ages of 18 and 24; 23.1% were from 25 to 44; 30.4% were from 45 to 64; and 18.4% were 65 years of age or older. The gender makeup of the village was 49.3% male and 50.7% female.

2000 census
As of the census of 2000, there were 225 people, 100 households, and 65 families residing in the village. The population density was 1,119 people per square mile (432/km2). There were 124 housing units at an average density of 617/sq mi (239/km2). The racial makeup of the village was 96.44% White, 0.44% Native American, 0.89% Asian, 0.44% from other races, and 1.78% from two or more races. Hispanic or Latino of any race were 1.33% of the population.

There were 100 households, out of which 23.0% had children under the age of 18 living with them, 51.0% were married couples living together, 7.0% had a female householder with no husband present, and 35.0% were non-families. 31.0% of all households were made up of individuals, and 17.0% had someone living alone who was 65 years of age or older. The average household size was 2.25 and the average family size was 2.83.

In the village, the population was spread out, with 20.9% under the age of 18, 7.6% from 18 to 24, 20.4% from 25 to 44, 28.9% from 45 to 64, and 22.2% who were 65 years of age or older. The median age was 46 years. For every 100 females, there were 120.6 males. For every 100 females age 18 and over, there were 109.4 males.

As of 2000 the median income for a household in the village was $25,313, and the median income for a family was $30,875. Males had a median income of $19,000 versus $16,250 for females. The per capita income for the village was $11,588. About 12.3% of families and 18.6% of the population were below the poverty line, including 34.8% of those under the age of eighteen and 5.1% of those 65 or over.

References

Villages in Furnas County, Nebraska
Villages in Nebraska